This is a list of Czech television programmes.

Czech language

0–9

A

B

C

D

E

F

G

H

I

J

K

L

M

N

O

P

R

S

T

U

V

Z

See also
Lists of Czech films

External links

Television programs

Czech republic
Television programmes